Murar  is a village in Kapurthala district of Punjab State, India. The village is administrated by a Sarpanch, who is an elected representative.

Demography 
According to the 2011 Census of India, Murar has 412 houses with the total population of 1,987 persons of which 1,051 are male and 936 females. Literacy rate of Murar is 83.98%, higher than the state average of 75.84%.  The population of children in the age group 0–6 years is 258 which is 12.98% of the total population. Child sex ratio is approximately 830, lower than the state average of 846.

Population data

References

External links
  Villages in Kapurthala
 Kapurthala Villages List

Villages in Kapurthala district